Siege of Boulogne may refer to:
Siege of Boulogne (1492)
Sieges of Boulogne (1544–46)